Tase Daagulen (ruled –) was the eighth ruler, or Burba, of the Jolof Empire.

References

15th-century monarchs in Africa
Year of birth missing
1488 deaths